Mesosa anancyloides is a species of beetle in the family Cerambycidae. It was described by Villiers and Chujo in 1962. It is known from Thailand.

References

anancyloides
Beetles described in 1962